Rodrigo Eduardo Echeverría Sáez (born 17 April 1995), nicknamed Eche, is a Chilean professional footballer who plays for Chilean club Everton de Viña del Mar. Primarily a central defender, he can also be deployed as a defensive midfielder.

Club career
He debuted on 9 September 2012 in a match against Santiago Wanderers for the 2012 Copa Chile.

International career
He represented Chile U20 at friendly tournaments in 2014 and at the 2015 South American U-20 Championship, playing four matches and scoring two goals.

He received his first call up to the Chile senior team for the 2022 FIFA World Cup qualifiers against Uruguay and Colombia in October 2020, but he made his international debut at senior level in the third matchday against Peru on 13 November 2020.

Honours
Universidad de Chile
 Copa Chile (1): 2012–13

References

External links
 

Living people
1995 births
Chilean footballers
Chile under-20 international footballers
Chile youth international footballers
Chile international footballers
Chilean Primera División players
Primera B de Chile players
Universidad de Chile footballers
Deportes Iberia footballers
Everton de Viña del Mar footballers
2015 South American Youth Football Championship players
Association football defenders
Association football midfielders